Grange North is the name of several places in Ireland:

Grange North, a townland in Killaspugbrone civil parish, County Sligo
Grange North, a townland in Relickmurry and Athassel, Tipperary - see List of townlands of County Tipperary
Grange North, County Westmeath, a townland in Mullingar civil parish, County Westmeath
Grange North, a townland in Killiskey, County Wicklow - see List of townlands of County Wicklow
Grange North, an electoral division of Waterford City and County Council